The piece of music once known as Wolfgang Amadeus Mozart's Symphony No. 2 in B major, K. 17, is now considered to be not by him, but by possibly his father, Leopold Mozart. This symphony has been given the number Anhang C 11.02 in the sixth edition of Ludwig Ritter von Köchel's catalogue of Mozart's music., and is now also catalogued as Eisen B 6 in Cliff Eisen's catalogue of Leopold Mozart's symphonies.

The symphony is in four movements in the usual quick–slow–minuet–quick pattern:

Allegro
(Andante)
Menuetto I & II
Presto
The publication of this symphony in the Alte Mozart-Ausgabe, the first collected edition of Mozart's music, shows several points at which smaller, editorially-supplied notes are given, suggesting an unfinished composition. For instance, in "Menuetto I", only the first violin and cello/double bass parts are completed; the second violin and viola parts in their entirety in this movement are editorial additions. 

Since K. 17 is now believed not to be by W. A. Mozart, the Neue Mozart-Ausgabe does not include this symphony as part of its edition.

References
 For the attribution to Leopold, see Stanley Sadie, The New Grove Mozart (New York: Norton, 1983), p. 197 (Mozart work list). . 
 Sadie, p. 197.
 The parentheses are around the tempo designation "Andante" in the score of the symphony.
 See the score linked below.

External links 

02
Compositions in B-flat major
Mozart: spurious and doubtful works